The 1991 tournament championship game was played at the Carrier Dome in front of 8,293 fans.

Tournament overview
North Carolina completed a perfect 16 and 0 season by defeating Towson 18-13, to win the NCAA Division I Men's Lacrosse Championship, the fourth overall for the Tar Heels.

Towson, coached by Carl Runk, became the first unseeded team to reach the NCAA Division I lacrosse finals. Towson got as close as 12 to 11 at the start of the 4th quarter, after scoring 5 straight goals. But Carolina controlled the remainder of the game in winning the national title for the first time since 1986.

Tournament results

 * = Overtime

Tournament boxscores

Tournament FinalsMay 27, 1991

Tournament Semi-finals

Tournament Quarterfinals

Tournament notes 

 Syracuse sets a new tournament record scoring 28 goals in their first round victory over Michigan State.

References

External links 
 http://www.ncaasports.com/lacrosse/mens/history/divi
 1991 NCAA Men's Lacrosse National Championship YouTube

NCAA Division I Men's Lacrosse Championship
NCAA Division I Men's Lacrosse Championship
NCAA Division I Men's Lacrosse Championship
NCAA Division I Men's Lacrosse Championship